Cheremisinovo is an urban locality (an urban-type settlement) in Cheremisinovsky District of Kursk Oblast, Russia. Population:

References

Urban-type settlements in Kursk Oblast